The Naciones Unidas Park ( or ) may refer to:

 Naciones Unidas National Park, Guatemala
 Naciones Unidas El Picacho Park, Tegucigalpa, Honduras: site of  statue
 Parque Naciones Unidas, Caracas, Venezuela: a sports complex, home of the Cocodrilos de Caracas (basketball team)
 Parque de las Naciones Unidas, Miraflores, Lima, Peru: a small city park